61st Regiment or 61st Infantry Regiment may refer to:

 61st Regiment of Foot (disambiguation), four British Army units carried this name 
 61st Pioneers, a unit of the British Indian Army, 1758-1922
 61st Infantry Regiment (United States), a unit of the United States Army
 61st Air Defense Artillery Regiment, a unit of the United States Army
 61st Cavalry Regiment (United States), a unit of the United States Army
 61st Anti-aircraft Missiles Regiment (Romania), a unit of the Romanian Land Forces
 61st Cavalry (India), a unit of the Indian Army
 61st Infantry Regiment (Finland), a unit of the Finnish Army, 1941–1944

American Civil War
Union (Northern) Army
 61st Illinois Volunteer Infantry Regiment 
 61st Indiana Infantry Regiment
 61st Ohio Infantry
 61st New York Volunteer Infantry
 61st Regiment Massachusetts Volunteer Infantry
 61st Pennsylvania Infantry

Confederate (Southern) Army
 61st Virginia Infantry
 61st Georgia Volunteer Infantry